Rancho Cabeza de Santa Rosa was an  Mexican land grant in present-day Sonoma County, California  given in 1841 by Governor pro tem  Manuel Jimeno to María Ygnacia López. The grant was along Santa Rosa Creek, and encompassed present-day Santa Rosa, California.

History
María Ygnacia de la Candelaria López (1793–1849) married Joaquin Victor Carrillo (1793–1835) in San Diego in 1809.  When Carrillo died in 1835, three of their twelve children were already married:  Maria Antonia (known as Josefa) to Henry D. Fitch,  Maria Ramona to José Antonio Romualdo Pacheco, and Francisca Benicia to Mariano Guadalupe Vallejo.  María Ygnacia Lopez de Carrillo and her 9 unmarried children left San Diego in 1837 and moved to Sonoma, California where her daughter Francisca Benicia Carrillo (1815-1891) lived with her husband General Vallejo.  General Vallejo was a critical factor in obtaining the two square league grant in 1841.

Eldest son, Joaquin Carrillo (1820–1899), was granted Rancho Llano de Santa Rosa just west of his mother's property by Governor Manuel Micheltorena in 1844.  Son Juan Bautista (1825–1841) died of poisoning. Daughter María de la Luz Esquatuia Carrillo (1814–1893) married her brother-in-law Salvador Vallejo and set up her home in Sonoma.  María López Carrillo died in 1849 and was buried at Mission San Francisco Solano in Sonoma.

Seven claims for Rancho Cabeza de Santa Rosa were filed with the Public Land Commission in 1852.

Son José Ramon Carrillo (1821–1864) was killed in 1864. Daughter Maria Marta Juana Carrillo (1826–1905) married Jose de Cruz Pilar Carrillo.

Historic sites of the Rancho
 Carrillo Adobe. The home of the Carrillo family.

References

 

California ranchos
Ranchos of Sonoma County, California